Dangerous Liaisons is a gay pornographic film directed by Michael Lucas and released by Lucas Entertainment in 2005. The film is a film adaptation of Les Liaisons dangereuses, a novel written in 1782 by Pierre Choderlos de Laclos. Set in the fashion industry of modern-day New York City, Lucas inserted pornographic scenes into the common themes of lust and deceit for the plot of his X-rated version.

A documentary of the film, More Dangerous: The Making of Michael Lucas' Dangerous Liaisons, premiered at the 2006 Philadelphia International Gay & Lesbian Film Festival on July 22, 2006.

Plot
Michael Lucas plays Marcus Von Halpern, head of a New York fashion empire with a manipulative side, who enlists the help of Valentine Moore, played by Gus Mattox. Von Halpern wants Moore, a world-renowned photographer and "player", to seduce Sebastian Lacroix (Wilfried Knight), the new lover of Von Halpern's ex-boyfriend, Tom Mercedes (Kent Larson). Moore agrees on one condition: he gets a night with Von Halpern as his reward.

Lacroix receives a call from his modeling agent informing him that he's booked for a photo-shoot with Moore. His boyfriend, Mercedes, warns Lacroix about Moore's reputation and advises him that Moore is not trustworthy. This segues into the first sex scene of the film, with Lacroix and Mercedes each topping the other in a flip-flop encounter.

In the following scene, Mercedes is seduced by his employee Matt Cody (Owen Hawk). They engage in sexual activity on the conference table in the boardroom when the cleaning guy (Mario Ortiz) shows up and joins in.

Meanwhile, Moore sets up his photography session with Lacroix and engages another model, J., to seduce Lacroix. Lacroix is later guilt-ridden.

Cody meets with Von Halpern, who wants to solicit information about Cody's boss, Von Halpern's ex-boyfriend, Mercedes.  Another sex scene ensues. Von Halpern's current boyfriend Bobby (Bruce Beckham) discovers Von Halpern's infidelity and seduces Moore to get even. Since Von Halpern has reneged on his payment to Moore in the form of a night together, Moore responds favorably to Bobby's advances.

The cameo appearances occur during the final scene, set as the opening night of Moore's new gallery exhibit. There is an additional plot twist as a main character is murdered at the end.

Cast and characters

Main characters
 Gus Mattox – Valentine Moore
 Owen Hawk – Matt Cody
 Michael Lucas – Marcus Von Halpern
 Bruce Beckham – Bobby
 Kent Larson – Tom Mercedes
 Wilfried Knight – Sebastian Laqioux
 Frankie – Delivery Guy
 Kymberley Nevison - Secretary
 Mario Ortiz – The Cleaning Guy
 J. – Mack
 Blair Ross – Marina

Celebrity cameos
 Boy George
 Lady Bunny
 Amanda Lepore
 Hedda Lettuce
 Michael Musto 
 Graham Norton
 RuPaul
 Bruce Vilanch
 Matthew Mariani

Awards
The film received thirteen 2006 GayVN Awards nominations and won four: Best Picture (tie), Best DVD Extras/Special Edition, Best Screenplay, and Best Supporting Actor for the performance of Kent Larson. The film tied for the 2006 GayVN Award for Best Picture with Rascal Video's Wrong Side of the Tracks Part One and Part Two, directed by Chi Chi LaRue.

The 2006 Adult Erotic Gay Video Awards, commonly referred to as the "Grabbys," Dangerous Liaisons received nine nominations with one award to Gus Mattox for Best Actor.

References

External links
 
 Dangerous Liaisons at Lucas Entertainment
 Michael Lucas' Dangerous Liaisons review at FriskyFans.org

2000s pornographic films
2005 films
Gay pornographic films
Films directed by Michael Lucas
Films based on works by Pierre Choderlos de Laclos
2000s English-language films
2005 LGBT-related films
American LGBT-related films
American pornographic films